The Song of Singing is a studio album by Chick Corea, released in 1971 on Blue Note Records. The recording features bassist Dave Holland and drummer/percussionist Barry Altschul.

Corea, Holland and Altschul made up three fourths of the free jazz ensemble Circle. The setting of this album is largely free and spontaneous, with a few pre-composed pieces included to maintain balance. The only piece not composed by Corea or Holland, or improvised by the trio, is Wayne Shorter's "Nefertiti", now considered a jazz standard. The 1987 CD reissue added two bonus tracks originally issued in the 1970s on Circling In and Circulus; the 1989 CD reissue added the last unissued track from these recordings sessions.

Track listing 
"Toy Room" (Holland) – 5:51
"Ballad I" (Altschul, Corea, Holland) – 4:17
"Rhymes" (Corea) – 6:50
"Flesh" (Corea) – 6:06
"Ballad III" (Altschul, Corea, Holland) – 5:34
"Nefertiti" (Wayne Shorter) – 7:05

1987 CD bonus tracks:
 "Blues Connotation" (Ornette Coleman) – 7:23
"Drone" (Altschul, Corea, Holland) – 22:25

1989 CD bonus track:
 "Blues Connotation" (Ornette Coleman) – 7:23
"Ballad II" (Altschul, Corea, Holland) – 6:36
"Drone" (Altschul, Corea, Holland) – 22:25

Personnel 
 Chick Corea – piano, keyboards
 Dave Holland – bass
 Barry Altschul – drums

See also 
 Circle (jazz band) – common members
 Jack Johnson (album) – recorded on the same day

References

External links 
 Chick Corea - The Song of Singing (1971) album review by Scott Yanow, credits & releases at AllMusic
 Chick Corea - The Song of Singing (1971) album releases & credits at Discogs

Blue Note Records albums
Chick Corea albums
1971 albums
Albums produced by Sonny Lester